Mesovelia mulsanti, or Mulsant's water treader, is a species of water treader in the family Mesoveliidae. It is found in the Caribbean Sea, Central America, North America, Oceania, and South America.

References

Articles created by Qbugbot
Insects described in 1879
Mesoveliidae